Deep Black is a video game, developed by Biart and published by 505 Games for Microsoft Windows, PlayStation 3 and Xbox 360. Initially entitled U-WARS and Underwater Wars, Russian studio Biart announced their publishing deal with 505 Games in July 2010, with a planned Q1 2011 release. At the time it was only announced for the PlayStation 3 and Xbox 360, however a second announcement in October 2011 confirmed the game for OnLive.

Deep Black was released on Steam on April 12, 2012 as Deep Black: Reloaded, and for consoles on April 25 as Deep Black: Episode 1. The game features an orchestral score written by Jeremy Soule, best known for his work in the Elder Scrolls and Guild Wars series.

As of 2023, the game no longer appears to be available on the Steam storefront.

Plot
Deep Black takes place in the near future, in an unsteady world of chaos, espionage, terrorism, and a desperate fight for world supremacy and possession of sophisticated biological weapons.

Gameplay
Most of the action in Deep Black takes place underwater, with players navigating the depths with "specialized underwater jet packs with integrated harpoons, mini submersibles and other high tech equipment." But it's not all swimming and shooting—505 promises a storyline with "complex science-fiction mystery, espionage, and bio-terror."

Reception
The game received a "generally unfavorable" 47 rating from Metacritic. Reviews criticized poor animations and story, while praising the underwater control mechanics.

References

External links
Official website
Deep Black interview
Deep Black at GeForce.com site
Deep Black article
Deep Black announcement

2012 video games
Episodic video games
PlayStation 3 games
PlayStation Network games
Third-person shooters
Video games scored by Jeremy Soule
Video games developed in Russia
Windows games
Xbox 360 Live Arcade games
Video games using PhysX
Video games set in the future
Video games with underwater settings
505 Games games
Single-player video games